Martyrs' Day is a Syrian and Lebanese national holiday commemorating the Syrian and Lebanese nationalists executed in Damascus and Beirut on 6 May 1916 by Jamal Pasha, also known as 'Al Jazzar' or 'The Butcher', the Ottoman wāli of Greater Syria. They were executed in both the Marjeh Square in Damascus and Burj Square in Beirut. Both plazas have since been renamed Martyrs' Square.

Rise of nationalism in early 20th century
The Ottoman Empire (now Turkey) ruled over Lebanon and Syria from its conquest in  1516 to the end of World War I in 1918. It was during Ottoman rule that the term "Greater Syria" was coined to designate the approximate area, which is in present-day Lebanon, Syria, Jordan and Palestine.

Turkish nationalism 
In the early 20th century, a new wave of Turkish nationalism started seething in Istanbul. It came to be known as Jön Türkler, from the French "Les Jeunes Turcs" (The Young Turks). For the first time, Turks spoke of specific Turkish nationalism against the generalised Islamic Ottoman Empire. The movement resulted in an unlikely union of reform-minded pluralists, Turkish nationalists, Western-oriented secularists and indeed anyone wlse who accorded the Sultan political blame for the harried state of the empire. The movement grew and resulted in the Young Turk Revolution, which began on 3 July 1908 and quickly spread throughout the empire.

Arab nationalism 
Inspired by the Young Turk Revolution, Arab delegates and political figures of the Empire started speaking of the Western notion of Arab nationalism as well. The Arabs' demands were of a reformist nature and were limited in general to 'autonomy', 'greater use of Arabic in education' and 'changes in conscription in the Ottoman Empire in peacetime for Arab conscripts' that allowed local service in the Ottoman army. At this stage Arab, nationalism was not yet a mass movement, even in Syria, where it was the strongest. Many Arabs gave their primary loyalty to their religion or sect, their tribe or their own particular governments. The ideologies of Ottomanism and Pan-Islamism were strong competitors of Arab nationalism. 

However, as the Turkish nationalism grew, discussion of Arab cultural identity and demands for greater autonomy for Greater Syria grew. These demands had been predominantly taken up by Christian Arabs for years but were now joined by some Syrian Muslim Arabs. Various public or secret societies (the Beirut Reform Society led by Salim Ali Salam, 1912; the Ottoman Party for Administrative Decentralization, 1913; al-Qahtaniyya, 1909; al-Fatat, 1911; and al-Ahd, 1913) were formed to advance demands ranging from autonomy to independence for the Ottoman Arab provinces. Members of some of tse groups came together at the request of al-Fatat to form the Arab Congress of 1913. The dissolution of the Ottoman Empire had begun. 

Resultantly, in 1913, intellectuals and politicians from the Arab Mashriq met in Paris at the first Arab Congress at which desired reforms were discussed. They produced a set of demands for greater autonomy within the Ottoman Empire. They again demanded for Arab conscripts to the Ottoman army not to be required to serve in other regions except in time of war.

Fall of Arab nationalism

Jamal Basha 
The situation, however, lost momentum and took a blow with the events that unfolded next. In 1914, the Ottoman Empire allied itself with the German Empire and formed the Ottoman–German Alliance. It was this binding alliance that ultimately led the Ottoman Empire to enter the First World War in August 1914 on the side of the Central Powers (composed of the German Empire, the Austro-Hungarian Empire and the Kingdom of Bulgaria) in battling the Triple Entente or the Allied Forces of Britain, France and Russia later joined by the United States. 

The outbreak of World War I brought Greater Syria further problems. The Ottoman government abolished Lebanon's semi-autonomous status and appointed Jamal Pasha, then minister of the navy, as the commander in chief of the Turkish forces in Greater Syria, with discretionary powers. Known for his harshness, Jamal Pasha was nicknamed "Al Jazzar", or "The Butcher". He militarily occupied Lebanon and indirectly killed a quarter of its population by starvation. 

Indeed, in February 1915, frustrated by his unsuccessful attack on the British forces protecting the Suez Canal, Jamal Pasha initiated a blockade of the entire eastern Mediterranean coast to prevent supplies from reaching his enemies. Lebanon suffered more than any other Ottoman province. The blockade resulted in a grave food shortage with swarms of locust invading Lebanon. The result was famine, followed by plague, which killed more than a quarter of the population.

French and British support 
Because of the growing dissent against Jamal Pasha and the Ottoman Empire, there was a movement on behalf of the Arab nationalists within Greater Syria for an alliance with France and Britain. The French and the British took advantage of the opportunity to support the Arab nationalists to weaken the Ottoman Empire. 

The Arab nationalists in Greater Syria, thus, started secretly corresponding with the French Consul in Beirut and explicitly asked the Allies for support. The French Consul in accordance with the British authorities promised support, ammunition and future sovereignty to the Arab nationalists, provided they revolt. 

In the meanwhile, the British authorities were also secretly corresponding with the Sharif of Mecca, Hussein bin Ali. In their correspondence, the British encouraged the Arabs to revolt in the Ottoman Empire and promised in return the recognition of Arab independence upon the Allies' victory. See Hussein-McMahon Correspondence.

French and British betrayal 
At the same time, collusion was happening across the borders. A secret agreement was struck between the governments of the United Kingdom and France where they agreed to subdivide the Arab provinces of the Ottoman Empire (excluding the Arabian peninsula) into areas of future British and French control or influence. The agreement came to be known as the infamous Sykes-Picot Agreement that provided for the case of the Triple Entente succeeding in defeating the Ottoman Empire during World War I. The terms were negotiated by the French diplomat François Georges-Picot and British Sir Mark Sykes. Nothing in the plan precluded rule through an Arab suzerainty in the areas. 

In a devious scheme in which the French consul had to escape Beirut, which was in Ottoman territory, it is said that the French purposely left behind evidence of the Arab Nationalists' correspondence with the French Consulate for the Turkish authorities to find them. The French Consulate burned all diplomatic papers except the specific letters of the Arab Nationalists. The purpose is proclaimed to be the premise of the Sykes-Picot Agreement. If the allies won the war, the Arab nationalists would never let them divide their lands and "rule" over them since the promise was to help them gain autonomy.

Execution of Arab nationalists  

The Turkish authorities found the evidence of the Arab-French correspondence which incriminated the Arab nationalists as "traitors" to the Ottoman Empire. 

On May 6, 1916, Jamal Pasha publicly executed  simultaneously seven Arabs in Damascus and fourteen in Beirut for alleged anti-Turkish activities. The date, May 6, is commemorated annually in both countries as Martyrs' Day, and the site in Beirut has come to be known as Martyrs' Square.

Nationalists executed in Damascus 

The following nationalists were executed in Marjeh Square, which came to be known as Martyrs' Square, in Damascus on May 6, 1916: 

Shafiq al-Muayyad al-Azm: Syrian Official Delegate for Damascus to the Turkish Parliament, son of former Sultan's advisor Muayad Pasha al-Azm, and grandson of former wāli of Damascus and Egypt Nassouh Pasha al-Azm. Shafiq al-Azm is also the grandfather-in-law of former Lebanese prime minister Abdallah El-Yafi.
Abdelhamid al-Zahrawi: Journalist and founder of Homs-based newspaper "al-Minbar". In 1913, he called for and headed the first Arab Congress in Paris.
Rushdi al-Shamaa: MP for Damascus in 1908.
Omar al-Jazairi
Shukri al-Asali: MP for Damascus in 1908.
Salim Ahmad Abdul Hadi: Member of the Decentralization Party
Rafiq Rizq Salloum: Lawyer and Poet

Nationalists executed in Beirut 

The following nationalists were executed in "Sahat al-Burj" or "Place des Canons", which later came to be known as Martyrs' Square, in Beirut on May 6, 1916: 

Emir Aref Chehab
Father Joseph Hayek
Abdul Karim al-Khalil, from Chyah
Abdelwahab al-Inglizi
Saleh Haidar, from Baalbek
Joseph Bshara Hani
Mohammad Mahmassani, from Beirut
Mahmoud Mahmassani, brother of Mohammad
Omar Ali Nashashibi
Omar Hamad, from Beirut
Tawfiq al-Bsat, from Saida
Philippe El Khazen, journalist from Jounieh, Lebanon
Farid El Khazen, younger brother of Philippe and also a journalist and editor from Jounieh, Lebanon
Sheikh Ahmad Tabbara
Petro Paoli, late husband of Mary Ajami
Abdel Ghani al-Arayssi, editor of al-Mufid newspaper
Muhammad Chanti, publisher of ad-difa'a newspaper in Jaffa.
George Ibrahim Haddad, journalist and poet

The martyrs of May 6, 1916 have been immortalized in Lebanese history textbooks, and historical events leading to their hanging are often compulsively memorized by school children.

Martyrs' Square in Beirut has become an even more pivotal landmark for the Lebanese people as it held the famous 2005 Cedar Revolution following the assassination of former Prime Minister Rafic Hariri.

Consequences of the war 

The periphery of the Empire started to splinter under the pressures of local revolutions and Allies' victories. The Ottomans eventually lost the war and the Ottoman Empire was dissolved. 
The Arabs' were given none of the things that were promised by the Allies. 

The Sykes-Picot agreement is seen by many as a turning point in Western/Arab relations. It negated the promises made to Arabs through T. E. Lawrence for a national Arab homeland in the area of Greater Syria, in exchange for their siding with British forces against the Ottoman Empire.
The agreement's principal terms were reaffirmed by the inter-Allied San Remo conference of 19–26 April 1920 and the ratification of the resulting League of Nations mandates by the Council of the League of Nations on 24 July 1922.

It is impossible to say what directions the proposed Arab Nationalistic reforms of 1913 would have taken if the war, the fall of the Ottoman Empire and the Balfour Declaration didn't happen. It is clear, however, that the Arabs never gained the freedoms they sought from the Ottomans, or from the Allies. The different form of Arab nationalism that came about after World War II is attributable to other factors such as the decline of colonial influence, rather than the constructive hopes of reforms which were debated back in 1913.

Current day

Some remains of the old Cinema Opera building (now a Virgin Megastore) and the bronze Martyrs statue are the only features left of the Martyrs' Square. The statue, which was inaugurated on March 6, 1960, is the work of Italian sculptor Renato Marino Mazzacurati. The statue, riddled with bullet holes, has become a symbol for all that was destroyed during the Lebanese Civil War.

The Martyrs' Square is a common location for protests and demonstrations, among the more notable demonstrations were the 2005 Cedar Revolution protests, that led to the expulsion of the Syrian army presence in Lebanon, and 2019–20 Lebanese protests, that is cross-confessional anti-government protests still ongoing and the largest country-wide protests the country has experienced.

References

Commemoration
Traditionally, on this day the presidents of both countries pay their respect by visiting the Tomb of the Unknown Soldier.

Monuments and memorials in Lebanon
Squares in Beirut
National squares
Public holidays in Syria
May observances
Remembrance days
Public holidays in Lebanon
Spring (season) events in Syria

ar:ساحة الشهداء (بيروت)
fr:Place des Martyrs (Beyrouth)
he:כיכר השהידים